Kassim Bakari Mwamzandi is a Kenyan politician belonging to the Mijikenda ethnic group. He was KANU MP for the Msambweni Constituency from 1988 to 1997. He resides in Msambweni. Before entering politics at 23 years old, Mwamzandi served as a clerk in the African court. Serving in the regimes of Jomo Kenyatta and Daniel arap Moi, from 1975 he acted as an assistant minister in the Ministry of Foreign Affairs, the Energy Ministry, Water Development and then the Ministry of Public Works.

References

Kenyan politicians
Living people
Year of birth missing (living people)